Mobile is a Canadian alternative rock band from Montreal initially composed of Mathieu Joly (vocals), Christian Brais (guitar), Pierre-Marc Hamelin (drums), Dominic Viola (bass) and Frank Williamson (guitar). Their debut album, Tomorrow Starts Today, was released in 2006. The band was nominated for two Juno Awards in 2007 and went on to win the award for "New Group of the Year". Hamelin left the band and was replaced by Martin Lavallée.

History

Formation and early history (2000–2005)
In 2000, Dominic Viola joined Moonraker, a rock band from Montreal started in 1997 by Brais, Hamelin, Joly and Williamson. After some initial success, including winning the CHOM L'Esprit in 2001, the band moved to Toronto in 2003. In 2005, the band signed with Universal Music Group Canada and Interscope and changed their name to Mobile.

Tomorrow Starts Today (2006–2007)

On April 18, 2006 Mobile released their debut album Tomorrow Starts Today through Universal Music Group Canada. The music video for their  second single, "Out of My Head", was nominated for a MuchMusic Video Award for Best Post Production.

Music from Tomorrow Starts Today has been featured in various media such as TV shows and video games. "Montreal Calling" and "New York Minute" were on the soundtracks for NHL 07 and FIFA 07 respectively. The album's title track, "Tomorrow Starts Today", was featured in the Canadian bilingual film, Bon Cop, Bad Cop, and "New York Minute" was featured in an episode of One Tree Hill.

Mobile won the 2007 Juno Award for New Group of the Year. Tomorrow Starts Today was nominated for a 2007 Juno Award for Rock Album of the Year.

On August 21, 2007 the album was released in the United States through The Militia Group.

Tales from the City (2007–2009)

The band entered the studio with producer Jeff Saltzman in December 2007 to begin recording their second studio album, Tales from the City, which was released October 7, 2008. Mobile released the first single from this new album, "The Killer", on July 1, 2008.

In late fall, 2008, Mobile set out on a Canadian tour in support of their album, and supported Chris Cornell, on his solo tour for his album Scream, on at least 7 Canadian dates.

In 2007 Mat Joly recorded "My Life Without Me" as a guest vocalist on Neverending White Lights' second album, Act 2: The Blood and the Life Eternal.

Drummer Pierre-Marc Hamelin left the band to pursue law. After a few weeks of searching for a new drummer, the band found Martin Lavallée who joined for the  Sound of Fiction tour.

The US Version released with 4 more songs including Dusting Down The Stars (2008 rerecording), Electrolove, The Low Road and Don't Wait

New Album, Breakup & Return (2009–2011, 2020's)
After the tour, the band began writing their third album. More than 50 new demos have been written for the record. According to guitarist Christian "Criq" Brais, the songs have a similar sound as their first album "Tomorrow Starts Today". The band will start the recording of the album this summer expecting a possible release date by the end of 2011. As the band wants to focus on the album, no tour dates are scheduled before they finish the recording and writing of the new material. Some of the working titles are:
- All The Troubles
- Wait Here
- Hold On
- Wake Me Up
- Gimme Gimme
- Symphony
- Don't Tell The Girl

On March 23, 2011, Mobile officially announced the band's break-up. Lead singer Mat Joly is venturing into a solo career. There is no word yet on what they will do with the material they wrote for their third album.

In the early 2020's, the band reformed with a few original members gone. Dominic Viola left and was replaced by Alex Dionne and Drummer Pierre-Marc Hamelin returned to the band rereplacing Martin Lavallée. the 3rd album's named "Roadmap To Redemption".

Discography

Studio albums

Singles

Notes

References

External links
Mobile old official website (archived)
Mobile new official website
Live Photos Of Mobile In Edmonton
Mobile on MTV Overdrive

Musical groups established in 2005
Musical groups disestablished in 2011
Musical groups from Montreal
Canadian alternative rock groups
Juno Award for Breakthrough Group of the Year winners
2005 establishments in Quebec
2011 disestablishments in Quebec